Group B was one of two groups of the 2022 IIHF World Championship. The four best placed teams advanced to the playoff round, while the last placed team was relegated to Division I in 2023.

Standings

Matches
All times are local (UTC+3).

United States vs Latvia

Finland vs Norway

Sweden vs Austria

Czechia vs Great Britain

Latvia vs Finland

Norway vs Great Britain

Austria vs United States

Czechia vs Sweden

Latvia vs Norway

Finland vs United States

Czechia vs Austria

Sweden vs Great Britain

Norway vs Austria

Finland vs Sweden

Great Britain vs United States

Czechia vs Latvia

Great Britain vs Finland

Latvia vs Austria

United States vs Sweden

Austria vs Finland

Norway vs Czechia

Great Britain vs Latvia

Sweden vs Norway

United States vs Czechia

Austria vs Great Britain

Sweden vs Latvia

United States vs Norway

Finland vs Czechia

References

External links
Official website

B